Mengálvio Pedro Figueiró (born 17 October 1939 in Laguna, Santa Catarina), simply known as Mengálvio, is a Brazilian retired footballer who played as a midfielder.

He earned 13 caps and scored 1 goal for the Brazil national football team. He was part of the 1962 FIFA World Cup winning squad, but he did not play any matches during the tournament.

Whilst at Santos he won the 1962 Copa Libertadores, playing in all three matches of the final against Penarol.  In all he played 371 games for Santos, scoring 28 times.

References

External links

1939 births
Living people
Sportspeople from Santa Catarina (state)
Brazilian footballers
Association football midfielders
Santos FC players
Grêmio Foot-Ball Porto Alegrense players
Categoría Primera A players
Millonarios F.C. players
1962 FIFA World Cup players
FIFA World Cup-winning players
Brazil international footballers
Brazilian expatriate footballers
Brazilian expatriate sportspeople in Colombia
Expatriate footballers in Colombia
Brazilian football managers
Santos FC managers